Longleng (Pron:/ˈlɒŋˌlɛŋ/) is a town and the district headquarters of the Longleng District of Nagaland. The town is inhabited by the Phom Nagas with Phom as the main dialect spoken by the people.

References

External links 
 Official site

Cities and towns in Longleng district